Pao Fa Temple is one of the largest Buddhist monasteries and Buddhist temples in the United States. It is located in Irvine, California. It mainly attracts Taiwanese American, Chinese American and Vietnamese American Buddhists, including many who are students at the University of California, Irvine.

The Taiwan-born Venerable Jen-Yi (真一法師) is the founder and abbot of Pao Fa Temple. In 1990 he accepted the advice from the Venerable Master Hsuan Hua of the City of Ten Thousand Buddhas to build the temple in Irvine. At a cost of $5 million, the temple was built on a former site of a Pacific Bell building and it was opened in late 2002.

Pao Fa Temple is the host of many Buddhist activities, including celebration of the Buddha's Birthday, various offerings, and many other ceremonies including chanting and meditation. It also hosts a summer camp.

See also
 Hsi Lai Temple (佛光山西來寺) located at 3456 South Glenmark Drive, Hacienda Heights
 City of Ten Thousand Buddhas (萬佛聖城) located at 4951 Bodhi Way, Ukiah
 History of the Chinese Americans in Los Angeles

External links
American Lotus Buddhist Association: Pao Fa Buddhist Temple

Buddhist temples in California
Religious buildings and structures in Orange County, California
Buildings and structures in Irvine, California
Tourist attractions in Irvine, California